Stagnant Pools are an American two-piece band from Bloomington, Indiana, United States, who have been compared to acts such as Sonic Youth and Joy Division by the Chicago Reader, and Pitchfork. The ensemble consists of  Bryan and Douglass Enas.

On May 17, 2012, it was announced that the group's first album, Temporary Room, would be released on August 7, 2012, by Polyvinyl Records.

The band has supported Maxïmo Park, Japandroids, David Bazan, and School of Seven Bells, on tour.

Personnel
 Bryan Enas – vocals, guitar
 Doug Enas - drums

Discography

Albums
 Temporary Room (Polyvinyl Records, August 2012)
Geist (Polyvinyl, June 10, 2014)

References

Alternative rock groups from Indiana
American musical duos
Musical groups established in 2010
American shoegaze musical groups
2010 establishments in Indiana